Cophixalus verrucosus (common name: Moroke rainforest frog) is a species of frog in the family Microhylidae.
It is endemic to Papua New Guinea.
Its natural habitats are tropical moist lowland forests, moist montane forests, and heavily degraded former forest.

References

verrucosus
Amphibians of Papua New Guinea
Endemic fauna of Papua New Guinea
Taxonomy articles created by Polbot
Amphibians described in 2002